Hina-puku-ia is the goddess of fishermen in Hawaiian mythology.

References 

Hawaiian goddesses
Tutelary deities